Psychology of Music is a peer-reviewed academic journal that publishes papers in the field of music psychology. The editor-in-chief is Alexandra Lamont (Keele University). It was established in 1973 and is published by SAGE Publications on behalf of the Society for Education, Music and Psychology Research.

Abstracting and indexing 
The journal is abstracted and indexed in Scopus and the Social Sciences Citation Index. According to the Journal Citation Reports, its 2012 impact factor is 1.553.

References

External links 
 
 Society for Education, Music and Psychology Research

SAGE Publishing academic journals
English-language journals
Psychology journals
Quarterly journals
Publications established in 1973
Academic journals associated with learned and professional societies